The U of M Transitway is a busway that runs between the University of Minnesota's Minneapolis and St. Paul campuses.  Use of the roadway is limited to buses, bicycles, and emergency vehicles.  The University of Minnesota runs zero-fare buses along the busway connecting the two campuses, primarily the Campus Connector but also shuttles to and from the St. Paul campus for football games.  A bicycle trail runs alongside the transitway for most of its distance.  Between the endpoints, there are only two intersections with stoplights controlling busway traffic at Energy Park Drive and Como Avenue.  The stoplights are designed to normally give the buses priority, so it is possible for many buses to run the length of the transitway without stopping.

Initial plans
Plans for a park-and-ride between the Saint Paul and Minneapolis campuses were first introduced in 1976. The project was delayed due to St. Anthony Park neighborhood concerns, required land purchases, University budgets and federal transportation requirements. U.S. Representative Martin Olav Sabo pushed through $2.8 million for the transitway in the 1987 House appropriations bill. The final project was approved in 1990 and included three park and ride lots, two in Minneapolis and one in Saint Paul. The project added 2,400 parking spaces to the Minneapolis campus. The project cost $21 million with $1.2 million from MnDOT, $6.4 million from the University and $13.5 million in federal money from the Interstate Substitution Funds.  The busway opened in 1992.

Current use

There were a large number of crashes in the early years of the transitway.  It was determined that many intersections along the route did not have good visibility, so that led to a project in the late 1990s to add magnetic loops and Autoscope devices to detect buses and bicycles.  These systems activate lighted stop signs to grab the attention of motorists approaching on cross streets.

During the Minnesota State Fair (late August through Labor Day each year), Metro Transit along with other area bus companies use parts of the transitway as a fast way to get to Como Avenue via 280 to Energy Park Drive, creating a seamless park and ride system from across the metro.  The transitway also sees usage by non-University buses in other parts of the year. As of 2009, the Minnesota Valley Transit Authority uses the transitway to bring buses to a parking lot across from the State Fairgrounds which is used as a layover point.

2008 modification
Previously, it had run all the way to Oak Street in front of Mariucci Arena. This process also removed two stops on the western end of the transitway where there had previously been parking lots. Northbound Campus Connectors loop north around the stadium on 6th Street and Oak Street, while southbound buses use Oak Street to University Avenue before turning right onto 26th Avenue. The western stops were eliminated, while the eastern stops were moved to the entrance of the transitway. Stops at the eastern end of the transitway at Commonwealth Avenue were not affected.

References

External links
Busing - University of Minnesota Parking and Transportation Services

University of Minnesota
Bus rapid transit in Minnesota
Transportation in Minneapolis–Saint Paul
Zero-fare transport services
Minnesota State Fair
1992 establishments in Minnesota
Metro Transit (Minnesota)